Lever House is a  office building at 390 Park Avenue in the Midtown Manhattan neighborhood of New York City. The building was designed in the International Style by Gordon Bunshaft and Natalie de Blois of Skidmore, Owings & Merrill (SOM) as the headquarters of soap company Lever Brothers, a subsidiary of Unilever. Constructed from 1950 to 1952, it was the second skyscraper in New York City with a glass curtain wall, after the United Nations Secretariat Building. 

The building contains 21 office stories topped by a triple-height mechanical section. The ground story contains a courtyard and public space, while the second story overhangs the plaza on a set of columns. The remaining stories are designed as a slab occupying the northern one-quarter of the site. The slab design was chosen to conform with the city's 1916 Zoning Resolution while avoiding the need for setbacks, which had been included in previous skyscrapers built under the ordinance.

The construction of Lever House changed Park Avenue in Midtown from an avenue with masonry apartment buildings to one with International-style office buildings. The building's design was also copied by several other structures worldwide. Lever House was intended solely for Lever Brothers' use, and its small size resulted in proposals to redevelop the site with a larger skyscraper. Following one such proposal, the building became a New York City designated landmark in 1982 and was added to the National Register of Historic Places in 1983. Unilever moved most of its offices out of Lever House in 1997, and Aby Rosen's RFR Realty took over the building. After SOM renovated the building from 2000 to 2001, Lever House was used as a standard office building with multiple tenants. SOM renovated the building again starting in 2022.

Site 
Lever House is at 390 Park Avenue, on the western sidewalk between 53rd Street and 54th Street, in the Midtown Manhattan neighborhood of New York City. Nearby buildings include the DuMont Building and Hotel Elysée along the same city block, on 54th Street to the west; 399 Park Avenue directly across Park Avenue to the east; the Seagram Building diagonally across Park Avenue and 53rd Street to the southeast; and the CBS Studio Building, Park Avenue Plaza, and Racquet and Tennis Club Building across 53rd Street to the south. The Banco Santander building on 53rd Street also abuts Lever House.

During the early 19th century, the site of Lever House was part of a farm, which was developed later in that century with four- and five-story row houses. By the late 19th century, the Park Avenue railroad line ran in an open-cut in the middle of Park Avenue. The line was covered with the construction of Grand Central Terminal in the early 20th century, spurring development in the surrounding area, Terminal City. The adjacent stretch of Park Avenue became a wealthy neighborhood with upscale apartments. On Lever House's site, there were twenty-two rowhouses on 53rd and 54th Streets, owned by Robert Walton Goelet. Twenty of these were demolished in 1936 and replaced by the Art Deco Normandie theater and a one-story "taxpayer" structure, while two rowhouses remained at 62 and 64 East 54th Street.

Architecture 
Lever House was designed by Gordon Bunshaft and Natalie de Blois of Skidmore, Owings & Merrill (SOM) in the International Style. Lever House, the Seagram Building, the former Union Carbide Building, and the Pepsi-Cola Building are part of a grouping of International Style structures developed on Park Avenue from 46th to 59th Street during the mid-20th century. Although the building was completed in 1952, the design largely incorporates ideas first proposed by Le Corbusier and Ludwig Mies van der Rohe in the 1920s. The building was constructed by main contractor George A. Fuller Company, with Jaros, Baum & Bolles as mechanical engineers; Weiskopf & Pickworth as structural engineers; and Raymond Loewy Associates as interior designers. It was built and named for the Lever Brothers Company, a soap company that was an American subsidiary of Unilever.

Form 

Lever House's ground level is largely composed of an outdoor plaza, paved in light- and dark-colored terrazzo, with some indoor sections. A rectangular planted garden with a pool is at the center of the plaza. Lever House's plaza is legally a privately owned public space. To protect against adverse possession, the building's owners have closed the plaza to the public for one day every year since its completion. Within the ground-story plaza are rectangular columns clad in stainless steel, which support the second story. The columns, which extend to the underlying rock, are set  behind the lot boundary to avoid interfering with the walls of the Park Avenue railroad tunnel. The column layout gives the appearance that the upper stories are floating above ground. These columns give the appearance of an architectural arcade. The second story is designed with an opening at its center, overlooking the planted garden.

The third through twenty-first stories consist of a rectangular slab atop the northern portion of the site, occupying a quarter of the total lot area. The slab's positioning, with the shorter side along Park Avenue, allowed more natural light from the north and south facades. This design also served a technical purpose, as it complied with the 1916 Zoning Resolution, intended to prevent new skyscrapers in New York City from overwhelming the streets with their sheer bulk. As a result of the slab's small size, Lever House has a floor area ratio (FAR) of 6:1, in comparison to a FAR of 12:1 at Rockefeller Center and a FAR of 25:1 at the Empire State Building.

A provision under the 1916 Zoning Resolution had allowed structures to rise without setbacks above a given level if all subsequent stories covered no more than 25 percent of the land lot. This theoretically allowed the construction of slab skyscrapers of unlimited height. In practice, Lever House was the city's first high-rise building to take advantage of this provision. Previous skyscrapers developed under this zoning code had contained setbacks as they rose. If all stories had contained the same area as the land lot, Lever House would have been equivalent to an eight-story structure. While Rockefeller Center's buildings had somewhat similar slab-like designs, the vast majority of the city's previous skyscrapers had been designed to fill the maximum volume allowed under the 1916 Zoning Resolution.

Facade 

About thirty percent of the ground story is enclosed within glass and marble walls. There are three revolving doors leading to the ground-story lobby, near the northern half of the lot. The elevators, as well as an auditorium and display area on the same floor, are within a black marble enclosure at the northwestern corner of the building. There is also a vehicular ramp to the basement garage, as well as a loading dock, from the western section of the 54th Street frontage, at the lot's northwestern corner. A white marble enclosure with stainless steel doors encloses an emergency exit stair at the southeastern corner of the ground floor. 

Above the ground floor, all facades contain a curtain wall with heat-absorbing glass panes as well as stainless steel. The curtain wall was fabricated and installed by General Bronze, which had then just completed the United Nations Secretariat Building curtain wall. Unlike at the Secretariat, where the narrower sides were faced in solid material, all sides of Lever House's slab are faced in glass. A small portion of the slab's western facade contains a service core with masonry cladding.

Curtain wall 
The curtain wall contains vertical steel mullions that are anchored to the floor plates within the building. Between each set of mullions are glass window panes that cannot open. These consist of greenish panes for windows on each floor, as well as opaque bluish panels for spandrels between floors. The spandrel panels are separated from the window panes by horizontal mullions as well as muntin grilles. The spandrel panels were intended to conceal the masonry construction of the superstructure. During nighttime, one of every five mullions is lit. Venetian blinds were used to reduce glare.

The curtain wall was designed to reduce the cost of operating and maintaining the property and, as designed, was intended to filter out thirty percent of heat from sunlight. The fixed-pane windows were cheaper to install and reduced the amount of particulate matter that entered the building, as well as kept air conditioning costs down. Additionally, Unilever constructed a window-washing scaffold, which was suspended from a   "power plant car" on the roof. The scaffold, designed by Kenneth M. Young of SOM, could move vertically along steel rails embedded in the mullions. Two window washers were hired to clean the facade every six days. Each of the building's 1,404 windows could be cleaned within ninety seconds; because the window panes were fixed shut, they could be cleaned in less than one-third of the time it took to clean a sash window. According to Curbed, the scaffold was used for a publicity stunt that "used Lever-brand Surf soap to scrub the windows clean".

The fixed-position window panes required that the building be air-conditioned, so steel grilles are also installed on the facade for ventilation intake. The curtain wall cost $28,000 more compared to normal sash windows, while the double glazing cost $135,000 and the window-washing equipment cost $50,000. However, the air conditioning system resulted in $90,000 of upfront savings, $3,600 per year in energy savings, and $1,000 per year in savings from reduced air "leakage". The fixed window panes also saved $2,000 a year on window-washing costs compared to sash windows.

Features

Structural features 

The internal superstructure is made of a cellular-steel skeleton with floor plates made of reinforced concrete. Small sections of the floor slabs outside the restrooms, elevator lobbies, and service core are supported by concrete arches. The west end of the slab is cantilevered  from the furthest column while the east end is cantilevered .

The building's utilities run through the service core on the west side of the slab. Six elevators are provided in the service core: five serving the office stories, as well as a service elevator between the first and third floors. A seventh elevator shaft was provided in the building to serve the upper stories if an additional elevator cab was deemed necessary. The core was placed on the west end of the slab so that, if Lever Brothers had ever built a westward addition to the tower, the elevators could serve the addition.

Interior 
According to the New York City Department of City Planning, Lever House contains  of gross floor area. All of the space was intended for Lever Brothers; in exchange for a more prominent structure, the company had been willing to forgo additional space that could have been rented to commercial or office tenants. A Lever spokesperson said the design choice was an intentional architectural and public-relations feature, saying, "The fact is shops don't rent for much on Park Avenue. People buy on Fifth or Madison [Avenues]. All they do on Park is walk." A further consideration was that Lever Brothers wished for the building to be a corporate symbol for itself, rather than being shared with other tenants. In addition to its 21 usable stories and triple-height mechanical space, the building contained an employees' parking garage in the basement.

The enclosed section of the ground floor was largely oriented toward public use, with space for displays, a waiting room, a display kitchen, and an auditorium. Since 2003, the building's owner Aby Rosen has used the plaza and lobby as a gallery for the Lever House Art Collection. Exhibitions have included such works as Virgin Mother by Damien Hirst, Bride Fight by E.V. Day, The Hulks by Jeff Koons, The Snow Queen by Rachel Feinstein, Robert Towne by Sarah Morris, as well as several sculptures by Keith Haring and Tom Sachs. In 2003, a  portion of the ground story was converted into a restaurant with rounded walls, five dining niches, and a 22-seat private balcony.

The second and largest floor contained fan, stock, mail, and stenography rooms, as well as the employees' lounge and medical suite. It contains  of space. The second floor has also been used for artwork, such as in 2018, when the second and ground floors were lit as part of Peter Halley New York, New York. Above the southern three-quarters of the building was a third-story roof terrace clad with red tile, which was outfitted with shuffleboard courts for employees. Inside the third story were the employee kitchen, dining room, and cafeteria. By 2023, the third-story terrace was being integrated into Lever Club,  a  amenity area for the building's tenants. Lever Club is also planned to contain conference rooms, lounge seats, and a bar and restaurant.

The offices of Unilever and its subsidiaries occupied the remaining floors, with the executive penthouse on the 21st floor. At Lever House's completion, much of Lever Brothers' staff was female, so the offices were designed as spaces that "women would enjoy working in". Each of the upper stories within the slab contains  of gross floor area. Gypsum partitions on each of the office floors were attached to the mullions. The building was also constructed with air conditioning on each floor, as well as an automatic fire alarm system and mail conveyor system. The triple-story mechanical penthouse is atop the 21st floor and includes air-conditioning and elevator machinery, as well as a water tower.

History 
Unilever was formed in 1929 from a merger of two soap companies: the British firm Lever Brothers Limited and the Dutch firm Margarine Unie. Unilever's United States subsidiary was known as Lever Brothers Company and was initially headquartered in Cambridge, Massachusetts. The subsidiary took space at 445 Park Avenue, three blocks north of the present building's site, in 1947.

Development and early years 

The company began acquiring land on Park Avenue from 53rd to 54th Street around June 1949, leasing the lots from Robert Walton Goelet's estate. The negotiations were made secretively, involving fourteen sets of lawyers, numerous brokers, and several shell companies. As finalized, the lease was to run for sixty years. The main broker behind the transaction, S. Dudley Nostrand, won the award for the "most ingenious and beneficial Manhattan real estate transaction of 1949" from the Title Guarantee and Trust Company.

On October 5, 1949, Lever Brothers announced a wide-ranging expansion program within the United States. The company's president, Charles Luckman, announced the executive offices would be moved from Cambridge to New York City that December, taking temporary space at two buildings in Manhattan. A new executive headquarters known as Lever House, to be built on Park Avenue from 53rd to 54th Street, would house the firm's subsidiaries upon its expected completion in late 1951. SOM was hired to design Lever House when it was announced. Luckman, who also held an architect's license, would assist with the design. Although SOM had prepared plans for slab-like buildings in Chicago for a Lever Brothers headquarters, the company decided upon a New York City headquarters because "the price one pays for soap is 89 percent advertising [...] and the advertising agencies of America were there." In designing Lever House, SOM focused on the fact that Lever Brothers wanted  of office space all to itself.

Luckman left Lever Brothers in January 1950, because of unspecified disagreements with British and Dutch executives of Unilever. Luckman went to design several buildings of his own, initially prompting false speculation that he had been fired from his position at Lever Brothers due to Lever House's design. Final plans for Lever House were filed with the New York City Department of Buildings in April 1950, three months after Luckman's departure. The plans were publicized the same month. Demolition of the four buildings on Lever House's site was scheduled to commence immediately after the plans were announced. The George A. Fuller Company received the contract to construct Lever House in August 1950. The steel framework was topped out in April 1951.

The building officially opened on April 29, 1952, with a tour of the building and a ceremony attended by Mayor Vincent R. Impellitteri. Lever Brothers leased the building from the Metropolitan Life Insurance Company, taking over the responsibility of maintaining it. The New York Times estimated that the promotional value of Lever House amounted to $1 million per year, substantially more than the estimated $200,000 annual loss due to the lack of retail shops. The building also had an average of 40,000 yearly visitors, many of whom were architecture students, and employee turnover was just over one-third of the average turnover for the city's other large companies. In Lever House's early years, the enclosed section of the ground level was used for art exhibitions. These included the Sculptors Guild's annual exhibit as well as an annual heliography exhibition. Lever Brothers commissioned Robert Wiegand in 1970 to paint a  mural, Leverage, along a now-demolished wall adjacent to the third-story courtyard.

Decline 

Lever House's small floor–area ratio became a drawback for real estate developers in the years after its completion, even as that same quality remained popular among the public. The Lever Brothers Company rejected numerous rumors that the building would be replaced by a larger structure, even advertising the building's 25th anniversary in 1977 with a full-page New York Times ad. At that time, Lever House had hosted more than 250 exhibitions.

Proposed demolition and preservation 
Until the 1980s, relatively few preservationists were concerned about the demolition of curtain walls that had been completed between the 1950s and the 1970s. Preservationists only started to express concern in 1982, Fisher Brothers had signed a contract to purchase the fee position for the underlying land. The firm wished to replace Lever House, as well as the neighboring Jofa Building on 53rd Street, with a forty-story building containing three times the floor area. Lever Brothers rejected media reports that it was considering moving to New Jersey. Bunshaft said at the time that he never thought the building's small size would have resulted in its demolition. 

The plans prompted preservationists to request that the New York City Landmarks Preservation Commission (LPC) consider designating the building as a city landmark. On November 9, 1982, the LPC designated Lever House as a landmark. LPC rules specified that New York City individual landmarks be at least 30 years old, making Lever House the city's youngest landmark at that time. Fisher Brothers opposed the landmark status. The firm in charge of designing Fisher Brothers' proposed building, Swanke Hayden Connell Architects, prepared a white paper for the LPC, which described Lever House as "undistinguished and not worthy of preservation". George Klein, who was in contract to buy the lease on the building itself from Metropolitan Life, favored landmark status. At the time, Klein was trying to develop a structure on the Jofa Building site and incorporate Lever House into the new development. Lever Brothers also supported the designation, but it had hired its own architectural firm, Welton Becket and Associates, to prepare plans for the Jofa site. 

The landmark status had to be ratified by the New York City Board of Estimate to become binding. If the landmark status was ratified, the building could not be demolished unless the landmark status caused significant economic hardship even with tax exemptions. The Board of Estimate was to have voted on the landmark designation in January 1982, but this was delayed. It was unknown whether the Board of Estimate would have enough votes to uphold the building's landmark designation, since several board members had expressed their wish that the site be redeveloped more lucratively. This prompted preservationist Jacqueline Kennedy Onassis to say, "It would be too bad if we treated our buildings as disposables and threw them away every 30 years." Among the reasons Fisher Brothers had cited in their attempt to replace Lever House was the structure's deteriorated condition. Welton Becket and Associates estimated the cost of restoring Lever House at between $12 and 15 million. 

In February 1983, Fisher Brothers publicized plans for its forty-story tower, which they claimed would create 1,500 jobs and generate $9.4 million annually in taxes. The same month, several hundred preservationists, such as architect Philip Johnson and former U.S. first lady Jacqueline Kennedy Onassis, protested in favor of ratifying Lever House's landmark designation. Mayor Ed Koch, a member of the Board of Estimate, published a letter to the other board members in which he asked them to support designation. The Board of Estimate ratified the landmark status that March. The landmark status was approved with a slim 6–5 majority, as all five of the city's borough presidents voted against the designation. Lever House's preservation was described by The Christian Science Monitor as "sparking heated debate only in New York City" because, nationally, there was a trend in favor of preservation at the time. Lever House was added to the National Register of Historic Places on October 2, 1983.

Building decay and ownership changes 

As a result of Lever House's relatively small floor area, the land lot had  of unused development rights, which under New York City zoning code could be transferred to nearby buildings. However, the LPC had not yet determined whether such a transfer would be applicable to Lever House. Accordingly, the landmark designation caused an impasse between the Fisher Brothers, Klein, and Lever Brothers. Both developers' plans were based on full control of the building and land, as well as lease negotiations with Lever Brothers, whose lease was still active for another twenty-seven years.

Lever Brothers sued the Fisher Brothers in June 1983, alleging the latter was still attempting to gain ownership of Lever House so it could be demolished, thereby breaking Lever Brothers' lease. The Fisher Brothers relented that October, agreeing to sell its fee position to Klein. Sarah Korein acquired the land under Lever House from the Goelet estate in 1985, though Unilever continued to lease the building. Her daughter, Elysabeth Kleinhans, recalled that Korein referred to Lever House as her "Mona Lisa".

Through the 1980s, the building's blue-green glass facade deteriorated due to weather and the limitations of the original fabrication and materials. Water seeped behind the vertical mullions, causing the carbon steel within and around the glazing pockets to rust and expand. This corrosion led to most of the spandrel glass panels breaking. At least some of these structural failures were attributed to the fact that the technologies used in Lever House's construction were relatively new. According to documents filed with the city government in 1995, forty to fifty percent of the original glass had been replaced. Consulting engineer Vincent Stramandinoli proposed erecting a new glass curtain wall in front of the original curtain wall, which would then be removed. In 1996, Unilever proposed replacing the curtain wall with an identical wall designed by David Childs of SOM. Childs said at the time that only one percent of the glass remained. The LPC approved Childs's plan, but the proposal was not further acted upon at that time.

Restoration and office tenancies

RFR operation
Unilever announced in September 1997 that it was moving its Lever Brothers division to Greenwich, Connecticut. Following the announcement, Lever Brothers slowly began vacating the building, leaving Unilever on only the top four floors. At the time, Lever Brothers had been the building's only tenant. Shortly before Korein's death in 1998, real estate magnates Aby Rosen and Michael Fuchs acquired the building lease, although Korein's family retained the land lease. Under the agreement, Rosen's company RFR Holding was obliged to perform a comprehensive restoration of the facade. RFR negotiated a lease-back deal allowing Unilever to remain on the top four floors. The Korein family remained the owner of the land. RFR hired graphic designer Michael Bierut to expand the building's typeface, which previously had only included the seven unique letters in the name "Lever House".

In 1999, RFR Holding announced that it would spend $25 million on capital improvements, including a restoration of the building's curtain wall and public spaces, designed by SOM. The deteriorated steel subframe and rusted mullions and caps were replaced. New panes of  vision glass were installed, which were nearly identical to the originals but met modern energy codes. Work on the project began in 2000, at which point curtain wall specialist Gordon H. Smith estimated that the building only retained about a half-dozen of its original spandrel panels. The renovation project included the addition of marble benches, as well as a sculpture garden with works by Isamu Noguchi, to the building's plaza. Ken Smith Landscape Architect had proposed revising one of Noguchi's two unbuilt designs for a sculpture garden, but the Noguchi Foundation had rejected the proposals, leading Smith to redesign the garden using eight of Noguchi's sculptures. These elements had been part of the original plans for the building and were never realized. The work was completed by 2001. 

Following the renovation, Lever House became a standard office building with multiple tenants. Metal processor Alcoa (later Arconic) signed a lease in 1999 for five stories in the building. Other tenants included American General Financial Group; Cosmetics International; and investment bank Thomas Weisel Partners. In 2003, Lever House Restaurant became the first restaurant to open at Lever House. The windowless restaurant space, which was designed by Marc Newson, covered  and was hidden behind the public plaza's western wall. The restaurant closed in early 2009 and was replaced by Casa Lever, which opened later that year.

In the early 2010s, the administration of mayor Michael Bloomberg proposed the Midtown East rezoning, which would allow the Korein estate to sell the unused development rights from Lever House for up to $75 million. The rezoning was passed in 2016, enabling the Korein estate to sell the development rights. At the same time, although RFR had an annual ground lease payment of $6 million, the company faced a steep increase to $20 million when the lease was scheduled to reset in 2023. Because of the ground lease, RFR had trouble refinancing Lever House. By early 2018, RFR was three years behind on its rent payments and mortgage bondholders were looking to foreclose on the property, a move that could potentially cancel all of the building's office leases. Bondholders moved to foreclose on the building in May 2018.

Brookfield and WatermanClark ownership
In July 2018, a joint venture between Brookfield Properties and Waterman Interests (later WatermanClark) took the ground lease from RFR, becoming the building's landlord. Brookfield and Waterman purchased RFR's debt load in early 2019 for $12.8 million, a $68 million decrease from the debt's original value. RFR filed two lawsuits against Brookfield and Waterman during late 2019. One was related to the lack of sprinklers in the building, in which RFR was threatened with lease termination, while the other alleged that Waterman Interests had fraudulently taken over the ground lease using confidential information. In May 2020, RFR gave a majority stake in Lever House's operation to Brookfield and WatermanClark.

The new owners subsequently decided to renovate Lever House, as all tenants had left during the COVID-19 pandemic in New York City. In July 2021, SOM proposed restoring the building's historic design elements, replacing non-historic elements, and refurbishing the ground-floor facade with a new entrance to Casa Lever. A lounge for tenants and visitors would be created on the third floor, and a new HVAC system would be installed. Additionally, the architects planned to replace or clean the finishings and re-landscape Lever House's plaza. The LPC approved the renovation plans in January 2022, and work started shortly afterward. Upon the projected completion of the renovation in 2023, Brookfield and WatermanClark planned to market Lever House to a single large tenant or to several smaller boutique tenants.

Impact

Critical reception 
In 1950, before construction even began, Architectural Forum described Lever House as "infinitely more spirited and dignified than any other commercial office building" in the city. Upon its completion, the same journal wrote, "it is the shape of this building which is impressive, more even than the gleaming materials".  New York Times architectural critic Aline B. Louchheim wrote that Lever House was "beautiful as well as functional". British art historian Nikolaus Pevsner told The New York Times shortly afterward, "The fact that such an extraordinary building was commissioned from a firm rather than an individual genius [...] is different from" continental Europe. Architectural Record wrote of the plaza: "In this aspect, the entire structure is thoughtful, pleasant, and a decided advance over the average speculative building."

Subsequent critics also praised the building. In a 1957 article about architecture on Park Avenue, Ada Louise Huxtable wrote that "the staples of our civilization—soap, whiskey and chemicals" (in reference to Lever House, the Seagram Building, and the Union Carbide Building) were represented in the "monuments" then being developed on Park Avenue. According to British art critic Reyner Banham in 1962, Lever House "gave architectural expression to an age just as the age was being born". At the building's 25th anniversary in 1977, Paul Goldberger wrote that Lever House had been "a stunning act of corporate philanthropy". Furthermore, William H. Jordy thought Lever House set a "standard for office buildings" following World War II, while Goldberger wrote in his 1979 book The City Observed that Lever House was as influential to architecture as the Daily News Building and 330 West 42nd Street had been.

Others criticized Lever House both in symbolism and in design. When the building was proposed for demolition in the early 1980s, Luckman reflected in the Los Angeles Times that financiers had nicknamed it "Luckman's folly" during its construction. Critics also debased aspects of the design, such as Louchheim, who found the interiors "too obtrusive" and the penthouse offices "esthetically vulgar". Architect Frank Lloyd Wright called Lever House a "box on sticks" in a 1952 speech at the Waldorf Astoria, while Edward P. Morgan said the same year that "a 10-year-old boy could have done better with a Meccano set". Architectural critic Lewis Mumford, writing for The New Yorker in 1958, found the slab "curiously transitory and ephemeral".  Henry Hope Reed Jr., in his 1959 book The Golden City, contrasted a picture of Lever House with one of the Postum Building at 250 Park Avenue, captioning Lever House only with the words "no comment". In 1961, art historian Vincent Scully said Lever House's construction divided the landscape of Park Avenue without regard to the existing architecture. In 2022, Audrey Wachs of Curbed wrote: "In recent years, Lever House has become more of a landmark than a functional office tower", especially considering that the building's floors were too small to accommodate many modern companies' needs.

Architectural recognition 
In 1952, the year of Lever House's completion, Office Management and Equipment magazine gave the building an award for "Office of the Year". The American Institute of Architects (AIA) gave the building an Honor Award the same year. Lever House also received the Fifth Avenue Association's award for "best New York building" constructed between 1952 and 1953. The AIA further recognized Lever House in 1980 with a Twenty-five Year Award. As Yale School of Architecture professor Elihu Rubin told Time magazine in 2022, "There’s probably hardly a survey course in American architecture that doesn’t mention Lever House."

Design influence 
According to the LPC, Lever House's design was widely seen by historians as a major advancement in the International Style. Charles Jencks called Lever House's curtain wall a step in "penultimate development and acceptance" of the International Style, while Robert Furneaux Jordan felt the building's court "set a precedent that may lift New York to a new level among world capitals". Furthermore, following Lever House's completion, numerous glass wall skyscrapers were built in New York City and elsewhere. The surrounding stretch of Park Avenue became developed with commercial buildings. Many of the residential structures on Park Avenue were replaced with largely commercial International Style skyscrapers during the 1950s and 1960s. Those structures included the Seagram Building, whose co-designer Philip Johnson specifically cited the construction of Lever House as a forebear.

Lever House's design was also copied internationally: as Nicholas Adams wrote in 2019, "Lever House had represented a clarion call for modernity, and it was widely imitated." These structures included the Banco de Bogotá headquarters in Bogotá in 1960; Ankara's Emek Business Center, Turkey's first curtain-walled skyscraper, in 1965; the high-rise tower of Berlin's Europa-Center in 1965; and the Hydroproject headquarters in Moscow in 1968. Lever House's influence also spread to Scandinavia with Copenhagen's SAS Radisson, designed in 1960, as well as numerous consular offices in Germany, designed in the 1950s by SOM. According to Adams, the design was ultimately copied more than a dozen times around the world.

See also 
 List of New York City Designated Landmarks in Manhattan from 14th to 59th Streets
 National Register of Historic Places listings in Manhattan from 14th to 59th Streets
 Autotalo, a building in Helsinki, Finland, modeled after Lever House

References

Notes

Citations

Sources

External links 

 Lever House architectural drawings, 1950–1953 Held by the Department of Drawings & Archives, Avery Architectural & Fine Arts Library, Columbia University
 Lever House Art Collection
 Casa Lever

1952 establishments in New York City
Alcoa
Buildings and structures on the National Register of Historic Places in Manhattan
International style architecture in New York City
Midtown Manhattan
Modernist architecture in New York City
New York City Designated Landmarks in Manhattan
Office buildings completed in 1952
Park Avenue
Skidmore, Owings & Merrill buildings
Skyscraper office buildings in Manhattan